Nurzec-Stacja  is a village in Siemiatycze County, Podlaskie Voivodeship, in north-eastern Poland, close to the border with Belarus. It is the seat of the gmina (administrative district) called Gmina Nurzec-Stacja.

According to the 1921 census, the village was inhabited by 156 people, among whom 81 were Roman Catholic, 30 Orthodox, 7 Evangelical and 38 Mosaic. At the same time, 91 inhabitants declared Polish nationality, 26 Belarusian, 1 German and 38 Jewish. There were 16 residential buildings in the village.

The village has a population of 2,000.

References

Nurzec-Stacja